Giuseppe Albini was an Italian physiologist and physician, born in Milan on 27 September 1827. He died in Turin on 18 January 1911.

Biography 
In 1845, he began his medical studies in Pavia, where he attended Bartolomeo Panizza's anatomy courses. Expelled from Pavia for having taken part in the Springtime of the Peoples of 1848, he took part in the Five Days of Milan and the battle of Novara. Following these events, he went to Vienna, where he completed his medical studies and graduated in 1852. He became the student and then assistant of Ernst Wilhelm von Brücke, professor of physiology at the University of Vienna. He then left for Berlin, where he followed the lectures of Brücke's friend, Emil du Bois-Reymond, and Christian Gottfried Ehrenberg. Thereafter went to Bonn, Halle, and Utrecht. In October 1857, he was named professor of physiology at the University of Krakow. In 1859, Lombardy was liberated from the Austrians following the : Giuseppe Albini, despite his important position at the University of Krakow, resigned and returned to Italy to work as a natural history teacher at the secondary school of Casale Monferrato.

Works 
Giuseppe Albini was particularly interested in optics and chemistry and published articles on glandular secretions, embryology, and nerve physiology. He described small fibrous nodules on the margins of the mitral and tricuspid valves of the heart, residues of fetal tissue, which now bear his name: Albini's nodules.

Works (selection) 
 Ricerche sul veleno della salamandra maculata (1854)
 Lezioni di embriologia (1867)
 Trattato delle funzioni riproduttive e d'embriologia (1868)
 Sull'istruzione superiore e sull'ordinamento degli studj di medicina e di chirurgia, third edition (1882)

Translations 
 G. Hermann Meyer, Trattato di anatomia fisiologica umana (1867)

References 

19th-century Italian physicians
20th-century Italian physicians
1827 births
1911 deaths
Italian physiologists